The Gachado Well was excavated between 1917 and 1919 near the Arizona-Mexico border in Pima County, Arizona. Named after a stooped mesquite tree, the well served a ranch owned by Lonald Blankenship. The line camp and water rights were sold in 1919 to Robert Louis Gray, who built an adobe house at the site in 1930. The house became a line camp, a bunkhouse for cowboys on the range in that area. The camp was used until 1976, when the Grays discontinued ranching. The site is located within Organ Pipe Cactus National Monument. It is accessible via the rough, unpaved Camino de Dos Republicas, which also leads to Dos Lomitas Ranch, another Gray family property.

The site was placed on the National Register of Historic Places on November 2, 1978.

See also
 Bates Well Ranch, another of the Gray family ranches in Organ Pipe Cactus National Monument

References

External links
  

National Register of Historic Places in Organ Pipe Cactus National Monument
Buildings and structures completed in 1917
Historic American Buildings Survey in Arizona